Zely dos Santos (born 9 April 1977) is a Brazilian boxer. He competed in the men's light welterweight event at the 1996 Summer Olympics.

References

1977 births
Living people
Brazilian male boxers
Olympic boxers of Brazil
Boxers at the 1996 Summer Olympics
Sportspeople from Minas Gerais
Light-welterweight boxers